Jesse James' Women is a 1954 American Technicolor Western film starring as well as directed, co-produced and co-written by Don "Red" Barry, who portrays Jesse James. The supporting cast features Peggie Castle and Jack Buetel. Filming took place in Silver Creek, Mississippi.

Plot summary 
Jesse James is posing as a rancher whilst his gang is laying low.  He uses various women to plan his robberies.

Cast
 Don "Red" Barry as Jesse James (as Donald Barry)
 Peggie Castle as Waco Gans
 Jack Buetel as Frank James
 Lita Baron as Delta
 Michael Carr as Bob Ford (as Mike Carr)
 Joyce Barrett as Caprice Clark
 Sam Keller as Cole Younger 
 Betty Brueck as Cattle Kate Kennedy
 James Clayton as Cameo Jane (as Cully Abrell)
 Laura Lea as Angel Botts
 Alton Hillman as Champ O'Toole (as Al Hillman)
 Curtis Dossett as Banker Clark (as Curtiss Dossert) 
 Jimmie Hammons as Sheriff Clem Botts
 Mac McAllister as Ace, O'Toole's Manager
 Frank Cunningham as Pete

Soundtrack 
Don "Red" Barry - "Careless Lover" (Music and lyrics by George Antheil)
"In the Shadows of My Heart" (Written by Stan Jones)

External links

References

1954 films
Biographical films about Jesse James
1954 Western (genre) films
United Artists films
American Western (genre) films
1950s English-language films
1950s American films